Mohan Shankar, popularly known as Mohan, is a Kannada film actor, who started his acting career in 2000 with the movie Yaarige Saluthe Sambala. He reached the peak of popularity with movies like Kurigalu Saar Kurigalu, Kothigalu Saar Kothigalu and Malla, also starring Ravichandran. He was born on 24 September 1973 and is happily married. He has turned director with the movie Krishna Nee Late Aagi Baaro starring himself, Ramesh Aravind, Nidhi Subbaiah and Neethu. Mohan is multitalented, and is also a writer. He provided the story of movie Lava Kusha, starring Kannada superstars Shivarajkumar and Upendra, written screenplay and dialogues for more than 20 films. He is also participated in Bigboss Kannada Season 4 and was also one among the five finalists.

Filmography
1998 - Kurubana Rani
2000 - Krishna Leele
2000 - Preethse
2000 - Yaarige Saluthe Sambala (Kannada)
2001 - Jenugoodu
2001 - Amma
2001 - Kothigalu Saar Kothigalu  (Kannada)
2001 - Kurigalu Saar Kurigalu  (Kannada)
2002 - Kodanda Rama (Kannada)
2003 - Olu Saar Bari Olu  (Kannada)
2003 - Ramaswamy Krishnaswamy (Kannada)
2004 - Shuklambaradaram  (Kannada)
2004 - Yarige Beku Ee Samsara  (Kannada)
2004 - Malla (Kannada)
2005 - Lati Charge (Kannada)
2005 - Ugra Narasimha (Kannada)
2006 - Vip 5  (Kannada)
2007 - Thamashegaagi (Kannada)
2007 - Sathyavan Savithri (Kannada)
2008 - Akka Tangi (Kannada)
2008 - Accident (Kannada)
2008 - Ugaadi (Kannada)
2009 - Eshtu Nagthi Nagu (Kannada)
2009 - Karaavali Hudugi (Kannada)
2009 - Gadibidi Hendti (Kannada)
2010 - Krishna Nee Late Aagi Baaro
2010 - Shambo Shankara
2010 - Tarangini
2012 - Shikaari
2012 - Samsaaradalli gol maal
2013 - Chathrigalu Saar Chathrigalu
2018 - Hello Mama

Television
Kathegara
Silli Lalli
Nagini 2

As writer
Yarige Saluthe Sambala (2000)
Mr. Harishchandra (2001)
Bahala Chennagide (2001)
Shuklambharadaram (2004)
Lava Kusha (2007)
Chathrigalu Saar Chathrigalu (2013)
Hendtheera Darbar (2010)

As director
2010 - Krishna Nee Late Aagi Baaro
2012 - Narasimha 
2012 - Manjunatha BA LLB
2014 - Sachin! Tendulkar Alla
 2015 - Male Nilluvavarege
2018 - Hello Mama

References

External links
 

1973 births
Male actors in Kannada cinema
Indian male film actors
21st-century Indian male actors
Living people
Kannada film directors
21st-century Indian film directors
Kannada comedians
Kannada screenwriters
Bigg Boss Kannada contestants